The Hickman Sea Sled is an inverted vee planing hull invented by Albert Hickman. The Sea Sled is a direct forerunner of the modern high speed catamaran or tunnel hull. The reduced friction is due to a "trapped" gas film between the hull surface and water. A similar effect is seen in super-cavitating torpedoes where a gas generator creates a film separation to water friction.

"A new type of vessel, which promises to revolutionize water craft and which takes the same place on the water that the automobile does on land"  -  Scientific American 26 September 1914

See also
 Cathedral hull
 Boston Whaler
 Supercavitation propeller

References

 Campbell, Lorne. Innovation in Small Craft Design - A Tribute. The Royal Institute of Naval Architects Web Site. 
 Gerr, Dave. "The Hickman Sea Sled: The Best High Speed Hull Ever? (article)" Boatbuilder Magazine Sept/Oct 1998. 
 Gerr, Dave. "Sea Sled Slides Again (article)." Boatbuilder Magazine Jan/Feb 2003 
 Hall, Charles H. "Manufacturing Sea Sleds (article)." Motor Boat. 10 Nov 1926
 Nelson, Curtis L. Hunters in the Shallows: A History of the PT Boat. 2003 
 Seidman, David. "Damned by Faint Praise (article)." 100th issue of Wooden Boat, May/June 1991.

External links
 Miss Lakeside - Genius Comes Home to Roost, a 1925 Hickman Sea Sled
 The sea sledge
 The Sea Sled Story circa 1985
 Original Design and Conception of the 13-foot Whaler Hull
 Records of the Mystic Shipyard
 John S. Barry Papers
 Inverted Vee bottom boats ~ the start of a revolution

Boat types